The Monastery of St. Mark of Koriša was a Serbian Orthodox monastery built in 1467, located in Koriša, Prizren, Kosovo. The entire complex was declared a Protected Monument of Culture in 1959, and it is de jure protected by Republic of Serbia. It was a single-nave church, built on a rectangular foundation. It was severely damaged after the end of the Kosovo War in 1999.

History 
The ruins of the monastery of St. Mark of Koriša stands on a rocky outpost above the Koriša river near the village of Koriša, near Prizren. According to preserved documents, the monastery was built by Jovan and Branko Vlahić in 1467, and it was a metochion (granted church land) to the Hermitage of St. Peter of Koriša, built in the 13th century. The monastery is mentioned in the Ottoman defter of 1520. It was abandoned in the 16th century, and reactivated in the 17th century. In 1765, monk Neofit brought "many books from Dečani".

In 1779, Partenije Popović was a monk at the monastery, whither he brought several important medieval books and manuscripts. In 1859, a schoolteacher in Prizren, Nikola Musulin, found Dušan's Code, the constitution of the Serbian Empire. The following year the charter of the Monastery of the Holy Archangels also issued by Stefan Dušan was found in St. Nicholas Church of Koriša. On the western side, above the rock, a belfry with two bells was added in 1861 as a foundation of Sima Andrejević.

After that, monastery was almost abandoned up until 1995, when monastery life restarted. In 1999, the monastery was vandalized and set on fire, when the preserved fragment of the original fresco was destroyed. The monastery had a valuable library.

Gallery

See also
Hermitage of St. Peter Koriški
Cultural Property of Great Importance
Prizren

Notes and references
Notes:

References:

Sources
 
 

Serbian Orthodox monasteries in Kosovo
Religious buildings and structures in Prizren
14th-century Serbian Orthodox church buildings
Destroyed churches in Kosovo
Cultural heritage monuments in Prizren District
Protected Monuments of Culture
Archbishopric of Ohrid